The 1972 United States presidential election in Michigan took place on November 7, 1972, as part of the 1972 United States presidential election. Voters chose 21 representatives, or electors, to the Electoral College, who voted for president and vice president.

Michigan was won by incumbent President Richard Nixon (R–California), with 56.20% of the popular vote, against George McGovern (D–South Dakota), with 41.81% of the popular vote, a victory margin of 14.4%. John G. Schmitz was the only other candidate on the ballot, and, as the candidate for the American Independent Party, he received over 63,000 votes. Despite voting for a Republican presidential candidate for the first time since 1956, this result nonetheless made Michigan 8.8% more Democratic than the nation-at-large.

Nixon's victory was the first of five consecutive Republican victories in the state, as Michigan would not vote for a Democratic candidate again until Bill Clinton in 1992. Since then it became a Democratic leaning swing state.

Delta, Lake, Washtenaw, and Wayne counties were the only four of Michigan's 83 counties to vote for McGovern. Washtenaw was one of only five counties outside of South Dakota (McGovern's home state) to vote for McGovern after voting for Richard Nixon in 1968. Nixon became the first Republican to win the White House without carrying Washtenaw since Benjamin Harrison in 1888.

As of the 2020 presidential election, this is the last time Wayne County was decided by a single-digit margin. It is also the last election in which Michigan voted to the left of New York.

Results

Results by county

See also
 United States presidential elections in Michigan

References

Michigan
1972
1972 Michigan elections